The Prince George City Council is the governing body for Prince George, in British Columbia, Canada.

The council consists of the mayor and eight councillors.

The councillors are councillors-at-large elected for the entire city.

Municipal elections are held every four years across the Province on the third Saturday of November.

Prince George City Council members
2018-2022
 Lyn Hall, Mayor
 Frank Everitt, Councillor
 Garth Frizzell, Councillor 
 Murry Krause, Councillor 
 Terri McConnachie, Councillor 
 Cori Ramsay, Councillor 
 Kyle Sampson, Councillor
 Susan Scott, Councillor 
 Brian Skakun, Councillor 

2014-2018 
 Lyn Hall, Mayor 
 Frank Everitt, Councillor
 Albert Koehler, Councillor 
 Murry Krause, Councillor 
 Susan Scott, Councillor 
 Brian Skakun, Councillor 
 Garth Frizzell, Councillor 
 Terri McConnachie, Councillor 
 Jillian Merrick, Councillor

2011-2014
 Shari Green, Mayor
 Frank Everitt, Councillor
 Garth Frizzell, Councillor
 Lyn Hall, Councillor
 Albert Koehler, Councillor
 Murry Krause, Councillor
 Brian Skakun, Councillor
 Cameron Stolz, Councillor
 Dave Wilbur, Councillor

2008-2011
 Dan Rogers, Mayor
 Don Bassermann, Councillor
 Garth Frizzell, Councillor
 Shari Green, Councillor
 Murry Krause, Councillor
 Debora Munoz, Councillor
 Brian Skakun, Councillor
 Cameron Stolz, Councillor
 Dave Wilbur, Councillor

2005-2008
 Colin Kinsley, Mayor
 Don Bassermann, Councillor
 Shirley Gratton, Councillor
 Murry Krause, Councillor
 Debora Munoz, Councillor
 Glen Scott, Councillor
 Sherry Sethen, Councillor
 Brian Skakun, Councillor
 Don Zurowski, Councillor

2002-2005
 Colin Kinsley, Mayor
 Don Bassermann, Councillor
 Cliff Dezell, Councillor
 Murry Krause, Councillor
 Dan Rogers, Councillor
 Glen Scott, Councillor
 Sherry Sethen, Councillor
 Brian Skakun, Councillor
 Don Zurowski, Councillor

References

External links 
City of Prince George

Prince George
Politics of Prince George, British Columbia